Bà Rịa is a city in Bà Rịa–Vũng Tàu province in the Southeast region of Vietnam. Bà Rịa is split from Vũng Tàu by a river crossed by Cỏ May Bridge.
This is the de jure seat of the province since most of the provincial administration agencies are located here. Bà Rịa officially became the provincial capital of Bà Rịa–Vũng Tàu from 2 May 2012, replacing Vũng Tàu in that role.

Location
Bà Rịa is located 90 km east southeast of Ho Chi Minh City and 20 km northwest of the petroleum city of Vũng Tàu. Bà Rịa borders Châu Đức District and part of Tân Thành District to the north, Vũng Tàu to the south, Long Điền District to the east, and Tân Thành District to the west. Bà Rịa has an area of 197.5 km2, including seven urban wards (phường) (Long Toàn, Phước Hiệp, Phước Hưng, Phước Nguyên, Phước Trung, Long Hương, and Kim Dinh), and 3 rural communes (xã) (Hòa Long, Tân Hưng, and Long Phước).
As of 2011, the town has 122,424 inhabitants; the density is 3,500 inhabitants/km2.

Administration
The city was promoted from the town of Bà Rịa to the capital city on 22 August 2012. The town was founded on 2 June 1994 from the split of the district of Châu Thành into the districts of Châu Đức, Tân Thành, and Bà Rịa. 
Many provincial agencies have been relocated from Vũng Tàu to Bà Rịa. By 2007, this city was a 3rd-class municipality in Vietnam and was upgraded to 2nd-class municipality on 27 November 2014.

Transportation
Bà Rịa is an important transport hub of the province, on Route 51, Road 52 and Road 56. Bà Rịa is situated about 48 km southeast of the planned Long Thành International Airport on National Route 51 (Vietnam). Bà Rịa has Bà Rịa Secres Port. It is connected to Xuân Lộc by road.

Tourism
Bà Rịa is on the way from Ho Chi Minh City to the seaside resorts at the Long Hải and Bình Châu hot springs.

References

Populated places in Bà Rịa-Vũng Tàu province
Provincial capitals in Vietnam
Districts of Bà Rịa-Vũng Tàu province
Bà Rịa-Vũng Tàu province
Cities in Vietnam